Brigadier-General Sir William Henry Manning,  (19 July 1863 – 1 January 1932) was a British Indian Army officer and colonial administrator.

Early life
Manning was educated at the University of Cambridge as a non-collegiate student and the Royal Military College, Sandhurst and was commissioned a lieutenant in the South Wales Borderers in 1886. In 1888 he transferred to the Indian Army, and served in the 51st Sikhs. He was wounded in the Second Burmese War and also served in the First Miranzai Expedition and the Hazara Expedition on the North-West Frontier in 1891. He commanded the Mlanja and Chirad-Zulu expeditions in British Central Africa in 1893–1894.

Diplomatic and military service in Africa
In 1897 he was appointed Deputy Commissioner and Consul-General for British Central Africa and commander of its Armed Forces with the local rank of lieutenant-colonel, and served as Acting Commissioner for nearly two years. 
He commanded the operations against Chief Mpezeni in North-East Rhodesia in 1898, for which he was promoted brevet major in 1898 and brevet lieutenant-colonel in 1899.

Manning raised and commanded the Central Africa Regiment and was the first Inspector-General of the King's African Rifles from 1901 to 1907, with the local rank of brigadier-general (although his substantive rank was still captain). During Spring 1902 he undertook an official tour through Uganda and the East African Protectorate, returning to England in June that year. He was supposed to undertake a second tour of inspecting garrisons in British Somaliland, British Central Africa Protectorate, British East Africa and Uganda later the same year, but shortly after arrival in Africa was re-directed to join the force gathered in Somaliland to fight the Mad Mullah.

He was in Somaliland by the middle of November 1902, and in late December was appointed in command of the Somaliland Field Force. From 1903 to 1904 he commanded its 1st Brigade. In April 1903 he fought against the Mad Mullah's army in battle, inflicting 2,000 casualties. For services in Somaliland he was appointed Companion of the Order of the Bath (CB) in 1903 and Knight Commander of the Order of St Michael and St George (KCMG) in 1904. In February 1904 he was promoted brevet colonel and in August 1904 he was finally promoted to the substantive rank of major.

Commissioner of Somaliland and Governor of Nyasaland
In February 1910 Manning was appointed Commissioner and Commander-in-Chief of the Somaliland Protectorate and in November 1910 Governor and C-in-C of the Nyasaland Protectorate, where the border post Fort Manning (now Mchinji, Malawi) was named after him. He retired from the Indian Army in December 1910.

Governor of Jamaica and Governor of Ceylon
In February 1913 he became Governor of Jamaica and was granted the perpetual honorary rank of brigadier-general, which he had held for most of his service since 1901. In September 1918 he was appointed Governor of Ceylon. He was appointed Knight Commander of the Order of the British Empire in 1918 and Knight Grand Cross of the Order of St Michael and St George (GCMG) in the 1921 New Year Honours. He retired in 1925.

The Manning Cup school football competition in Jamaica was named after him.

References
Obituary, The Times, 4 January 1932

Footnotes

1863 births
1932 deaths
Graduates of the Royal Military College, Sandhurst
South Wales Borderers officers
British Indian Army generals
British Army personnel of the Second Anglo-Burmese War
Governors of Jamaica
Governors of British Ceylon
Governors of Nyasaland
Knights Grand Cross of the Order of St Michael and St George
Knights Commander of the Order of the British Empire
Companions of the Order of the Bath
King's African Rifles officers
British military personnel of the Third Somaliland Expedition
Alumni of Fitzwilliam College, Cambridge
Governors of British Somaliland
British military personnel of the Hazara Expedition of 1888
Members of the Legislative Council of Ceylon